Justice Viswanathan is a 1971 Indian Tamil-language film, directed by G. R. Nathan, starring Ravichandran and Major Sundarrajan. It is a remake of the 1969 Hindi film Do Bhai. The film was released on 12 March 1971.

Plot 

Justice Viswanathan is a popular justice who goes on a revenge hunt for the death of Manimaala. The turn of events that follows forms the rest of the story.

Cast 
 Ravichandran as Gopinathan
 Major Sundarrajan as Justice Viswanathan
 A. Sakunthala as Sandhya
 Manimala as Kanchana
 Thengai Srinivasan as Kittu
 R. S. Manohar as Kabali
 Manorama as Kanniamma
 S. V. Ramadass
 Vennira Aadai Moorthy
 Siva Sooriyan
 Pakkirisamy
 K. K. Soundar
 Ramanathan
 Baby Sumathi
 'Baby' Kumudha
 S. N. Parvathy

Soundtrack 
The music was composed by Vedha, with lyrics by Kannadasan.

References

External links 
 

1970s Tamil-language films
1971 films
Films scored by Vedha (composer)
Tamil remakes of Hindi films